Fan Expo Denver (previously Denver Pop Culture Con and Denver Comic Con) is a speculative fiction fan convention held annually in Denver, Colorado, in the United States. The event is a celebration of comics, books, movies, TV, gaming, and other pop culture.

The non-profit organization, Pop Culture Classroom, founded the convention in 2012. After being acquired by Informa/Fan Expo in 2021, the convention was renamed Fan Expo Denver.

History
The inaugural convention was held June 15, 16, and 17 in 2012 with 27,700 people in attendance. Founded as Denver Comic Con, the convention was created as a program for the educational organization, Pop Culture Classroom (formally Comic Book Classroom), and funded the nonprofit’s year-round efforts.

In 2015, attendance at the event exceeded 100,000, making it one of the largest fan conventions in the United States.

In 2019, the convention’s name was changed to Denver Pop Culture Con in response to the San Diego Comic-Con lawsuit.

Pop Culture Classroom organized and ran the convention from 2012 to 2019. The event was canceled in 2020 due to the COVID-19 pandemic.

In March 2021, Fan Expo HQ acquired the convention from Pop Culture Classroom and renamed the event Fan Expo Denver. Pop Culture Classroom will remain a part of the event as its featured charity and by providing educational programs.

Programming 

The convention includes celebrity panels, seminars with professional creators, actors, and artists, workshops with comic book professionals, and the Reel Heroes Independent Filmmakers Series. Elements of the convention floor include celebrity autographs, large areas like "Artist Valley" and "Celebrity Summit", comic book dealers and collectibles merchants, as well as fan-based organizations like the 501st Legion. Cosplayers are featured during the annual Cosplay Classic (formerly known as the "DCC Cosplay Shindig"), the Opening Ceremonies with acts and other surprises, and associated events have included the Four Color Mixer and a genre-themed concert traditionally held at the Hard Rock Cafe Denver.

Among the distinct tracks of programming, for instance, the convention focused on comics and media featuring or produced by Colorado-area comics creators, women, minorities and the LGBTQ Community. In 2014, the conventions's Comic Book Corral (CBC) and 8-Bit Lounge gave more than 9,000 students the chance to meet artists, create comic book-themed crafts, and get hands-on experience with everything from stop-motion animated shorts to professional makeup jobs. In 2015, the Pop Culture Classroom Kids' Laboratory (PCC Kids' Lab) continued building on this success. Along with the usual mix of artist discussions, arts activities and exhibits, the PCC Lab featured activities focused around S.T.E.A.M. subjects (Science, Technology, Engineering, Arts, and Math) and pop culture topics beyond comic books. They also expanded the 8-Bit Lounge to connect even more artists, educators and professionals with students ages 12–19.

Dates, attendance, and guests

Partnerships 

Since the inaugural 2012 event, Breckenridge Brewery has collaborated with the convention to brew and sell a specialty beer, with the name chosen by a fan contest. The 2012 beer, an American wheat ale, was named, “The Fantastic Pour.” The 2013 beer, a Belgian Wit brewed with Buddha's Hand fruit, was dubbed "The Caped Brewsader. The 2014 beer, an amber ale, was named "Brews Wayne." In 2015, “Hulk's Mash”, a pale ale brewed with mosaic hops and mango puree, was debuted. "Snape-ricot”, an Apricot American Lager, was voted 2016's beer name, in honor of the late Alan Rickman.

Aurora Rise, a non-profit group founded to provide financial support to victims of the 2012 Aurora, Colorado shooting, appeared at the 2013, 2014, 2015 and 2016 conventions. In 2016, Denver Pridefest was partnered with the convention, and there was LGBT related content.

Awards 
In March 2013, the event was voted “Best Fan Convention” by the editors of Westword, a local alternative press publication.

References

External links 

2012 establishments in Colorado
Comics conventions in the United States
Multigenre conventions
Recurring events established in 2012
Conventions in Denver